Marsassoum Arrondissement is an arrondissement of the Sédhiou Department in the Sédhiou Region of Senegal. Its seat lies at Marsassoum.

Subdivisions
The arrondissement is divided administratively into rural communities and in turn into villages.

Arrondissements of Senegal
Sédhiou Region